Sterling District No. 5 Schoolhouse is a historic school building located at Sterling in Cayuga County, New York.  It was built about 1853 and is a two-story hewn timber frame building with a front-facing gable roof, built above a mortared rubble stone foundation.  It is rectangular in shape and measures 28 feet by 38 feet.  It was used as a school into the 1950s.  It has since been used by the Sterling Historical Society for museum display space and as the Town Hall.

It was listed on the National Register of Historic Places in 2002.

It is now the Sterling Historical Society Museum.

References

External links
 Sterling Historical Society

School buildings on the National Register of Historic Places in New York (state)
School buildings completed in 1853
Buildings and structures in Cayuga County, New York
Museums in Cayuga County, New York
History museums in New York (state)
National Register of Historic Places in Cayuga County, New York